The 1967 Cal Poly Mustangs football team represented California Polytechnic State College—now known as California Polytechnic State University, San Luis Obispo—as a member of the California Collegiate Athletic Association (CCAA) during the 1967 NCAA College Division football season. Led by Sheldon Harden in his sixth and final season as head coach, Cal Poly compiled an overall record of 3–7 with a mark of 1–4 in conference play, placing fifth in the CCAA. The Mustangs played home games at Mustang Stadium in San Luis Obispo, California.

Schedule

Team players in the NFL
The following were selected in the 1968 NFL Draft.

References

Cal Poly
Cal Poly Mustangs football seasons
Cal Poly Mustangs football